María Guadalupe Sánchez (born August 4, 1995) is a Mexican racewalker. She placed 23rd in the women's 20 kilometres walk at the 2016 Summer Olympics.

References

1995 births
Living people
Mexican female racewalkers
Olympic athletes of Mexico
Athletes (track and field) at the 2016 Summer Olympics
World Athletics Championships athletes for Mexico